Rudnichny City District is the name of several city divisions in Russia:
Rudnichny City District, Kemerovo, a city district of Kemerovo, the administrative center of Kemerovo Oblast
Rudnichny City District, Prokopyevsk, a city district of Prokopyevsk, a city in Kemerovo Oblast

See also
Rudnichny (disambiguation)

References